Alina Chan is a Canadian molecular biologist specializing in gene therapy and cell engineering at the Broad Institute of MIT and Harvard, where she is a postdoctoral fellow. During the COVID-19 pandemic she became known for questioning the prevailing consensus regarding the origins of the virus and publicly advocating a laboratory escape hypothesis.

Biography 
Chan was born in Vancouver, British Columbia, to Singaporean parents. Her family returned to Singapore shortly after, where she grew up. She returned to Canada after high school to study biochemistry and molecular biology at the University of British Columbia, where she earned a PhD. She then joined Harvard University as a postdoctoral scholar, later joining the Stanley Center for Psychiatric Research at the Broad Institute.

COVID-19 origins 

Chan became known during the COVID-19 pandemic for co-authoring a preprint according to which the virus was "pre-adapted" to humans and suggesting COVID-19 could have escaped from a laboratory. The preprint was not accepted or published by any scientific journals, but received a significant reception in the popular press.

The reaction of virologists and other specialists to Chan's hypothesis has been largely, but not exclusively, negative. The New York Times noted in October 2021 that Chan's view has been "widely disputed by other scientists", but some have commended her willingness to advance alternative hypotheses in the face of controversy. Jonathan Eisen of UC Davis praised Chan for raising the lab-origin discussion, but said her views remain conjecture, as not enough disease outbreaks have been traced in enough molecular detail to know what is normal, noting also that the virus continues to change and adapt. Sixteen months after Chan's preprint was shared online, a scientific review article published in Cell described the pre-adaptation theory as "lacking validity." 

Chan detailed her views publicly in long detailed Twitter postings called "tweetorials" and wrote opinion pieces on the subject with science journalist Matt Ridley in the Wall Street Journal and in The Daily Telegraph. Chan later signed open letters together with other scientists published in the Wall Street Journal and The New York Times, calling for full and unrestricted international forensic investigations into all possible origins of the virus. She was one of 18 scientists who signed a letter in Science Magazine calling again for a credible investigation into the origins of the virus. The letter called for a "proper investigation" into "both natural and laboratory spillovers" and was widely covered in the press and brought the debate on the possible lab origins of the virus into the mainstream.

Chan and Ridley authored a book entitled Viral: The Search for the Origin of COVID-19, published by HarperCollins in November 2021. Chan has stated after the book was published she planned to change her name.

Chan participated in a debate on COVID-19 origins organized by Science magazine, which included scientists Linfa Wang, Michael Worobey, and Jesse Bloom.

References

External links

21st-century Canadian biologists
21st-century Canadian women scientists
Canadian molecular biologists
Canadian people of Chinese descent
Canadian people of Singaporean descent
Canadian women biologists
Living people
Scientists from Vancouver
University of British Columbia alumni
Women molecular biologists
Year of birth missing (living people)